Josef Umbach (8 December 1889 – 30 September 1976) was a German international footballer.

References

1889 births
1976 deaths
Association football forwards
German footballers
Germany international footballers